Cubley may refer to:
Cubley, Derbyshire
Cubley, South Yorkshire

See also

Curley (disambiguation)